Chuttalunnaru Jagratha is a 1980 Indian Telugu-language masala film directed by B. V. Prasad. The film stars Krishna and Sridevi. It revolves around a man who was framed for murder, and a lookalike who aids him in finding the true killers. It was released on 8 August 1980 and became a commercial success. It was remade in Tamil as Pokkiri Raja (1982) and in Hindi as Mawaali (1983), with Sridevi returning for both.

Plot 

An industrialist's daughter and the manager of the industrialist's factory fall in love, despite initial conflicts. The industrialist's greedy relative wants his son to marry the girl, lusting for her wealth. Father and son murder the industrialist, and the factory manager is wrongfully convicted. In prison, he meets a lookalike and they plan to bring the real killers to justice.

Cast

Production 
Chuttalunnaru Jagratha was directed by B. V. Prasad and produced by Alaparthi Suryanarayana under Amrutha Films. The story and screenplay were written by M. Balayya, and the dialogues by D. V. Narasaraju. Cinematography was handled by S. S. Lal, and editing by S. P. S. Veerappa.

Soundtrack 
The soundtrack was composed by M. S. Viswanathan.

Release and reception 
Chuttalunnaru Jagratha was released on 8 August 1980 and became a commercial success. The film was remade in Tamil as Pokkiri Raja (1982) and Hindi as Mawaali (1983), with Sridevi returning for both.

References

External links 
 

1980s Telugu-language films
Films about miscarriage of justice
Films scored by M. S. Viswanathan
1980s masala films
Telugu films remade in other languages